KYCR may refer to: 

KYCR (AM), a radio station (1440 AM) licensed to Golden Valley, Minnesota, United States
KDIZ (AM), a radio station (1570 AM) licensed to Golden Valley, Minnesota, United States, which used the call sign KYCR from 1988 to 2015